Dufferin—Peel—Wellington—Grey is a former provincial electoral district in southwestern Ontario, Canada that elected one Member of the Legislative Assembly of Ontario. It was created in 1999 from Wellington, Grey and Dufferin—Peel. It was abolished in 2007 into Dufferin—Caledon, Bruce—Grey—Owen Sound, Perth—Wellington and Wellington—Halton Hills ridings.

The riding included all of Dufferin County plus the municipalities of Caledon, Erin, West Luther Township, Arthur, Southgate and Mount Forest.

The provincial riding of Dufferin—Peel—Wellington—Grey was created when the Harris government passed a bill reducing the number of ridings electing Members of Provincial Parliament (MPPs) in the Legislative Assembly so that they were the same as the number of federal Members of Parliament from Ontario.

David Tilson of the Progressive Conservative Party of Ontario was elected from the riding in the 1999 provincial election. In April 2002, Tilson resigned his seat in order to give the newly elected party leader and Premier of Ontario, Ernie Eves, an opportunity to enter the provincial legislature through a by-election. Eves won the by-election and retained his seat in the subsequent 2003 election although his government was defeated.

Eves subsequently resigned as party leader and, on January 31, 2005, he resigned his seat in order to give his successor, John Tory the opportunity to enter the legislature through a by-election.

The by-election was held on March 17, 2005. Tory was the Progressive Conservative candidate against Bob Duncanson for the Ontario Liberal Party, Lynda McDougall for the Ontario New Democratic Party, Frank de Jong who was leader of the Green Party of Ontario as well as the party's candidate, and independent Representative candidate William Cook. Tory won, with 56.3% of the vote.

Members of Provincial Parliament
David Tilson, Progressive Conservative (1999–2002)
Ernie Eves, Progressive Conservative (2002–2005)
John Tory, Progressive Conservative (2005–2007)

Election results

Former provincial electoral districts of Ontario
Orangeville, Ontario